Consolidator may refer to:

 Consolidator (computing), a linkage editor in computing
 Airline consolidator, an airline ticket broker
 Travel consolidator, a consolidation of travel services in one package or at one single point of access

See also
 Consolidation (disambiguation)